City University of Seattle (CityU) is a private university in Seattle, Washington. In 2016–17, CityU enrolled 6,755 students worldwide. The university consists of the School of Business and Management, The School of Education and Leadership, The School of Technology and Computing, The School of Health and Social Sciences, and Washington Academy of Languages. CityU of Seattle offers campus education around the world and online education. CityU is part of the National University System, a private nonprofit university system.

History 
City University was established in 1973 as City College by Dr. Michael A. Pastore  to provide higher education for working adults. First opened in rented office space in the Lyon Building in downtown Seattle, over the years, the school has expanded its locations worldwide and negotiated partnerships with other educational institutions to offer certificate and degree programs. , City University of Seattle has graduated more than 50,000 students worldwide.

Accreditation 
City University of Seattle is accredited by the Northwest Commission on Colleges and Universities (NWCCU). The School of Management is accredited by the Accreditation Council for Business Schools and Programs (ACBSP). City U's Project Management degree programs are accredited by the Project Management Institute.

City University of Seattle's School of Technology and Computing has an ABET accredited program – the Bachelor of Science in Information Systems – and is designated a National Center of Academic Excellence in Cyber Defense Education by the National Security Agency and Department of Homeland Security.

Campuses 
City University is headquartered in the Belltown area of downtown Seattle. CityU has campuses around the world.

Canada
 Vancouver
 Victoria
 Edmonton
 Calgary
China
 Beijing
 Shenzhen
Czech Republic
 Prague
Mexico
 Mexicali
 Tijuana
 Ensenada
 Monterrey
 Puebla
 San Luis Potosí
Slovakia
 Bratislava
 Trenčín
Switzerland
 Lucerne
Vietnam
 Hanoi

Rankings 
In 2019, U.S. News & World Report ranked City University of Seattle's bachelor's degree programs as a "Best Online Bachelors Degree". The publication also ranked CityU as a "Best Online Program for Veterans".

Notable alumni and faculty 
 Bruce Harrell, Current Mayor of Seattle
 Calvin Ayre, Canadian billionaire and founder of Bodog Entertainment Group and the Calvin Ayre Foundation
 Larry W. Campbell, former Mayor of Vancouver, Canadian Senator and Chief Coroner.
 Donald P. Dunbar,  Adjutant General of Wisconsin U.S. Air Force
 Kelly Jennings, NFL player, City University of Seattle higher education spokesperson
 Maya Morsy, head of Egypt's National Council for Women
 Larry W. Campbell, Former Board Member
 Scott Reske, Indiana House of Representatives
 Mohamed Fahmy, Canadian-Egyptian journalist with CNN and Al Jazeera English

References

External links 
 Official website

 
Educational institutions established in 1973
Private universities and colleges in Washington (state)
Seattle metropolitan area
Universities and colleges accredited by the Northwest Commission on Colleges and Universities
1973 establishments in Washington (state)